Celenia Toribio De León (born ) is a Dominican Republic female volleyball player. With her club Mirador Santo Domingo she competed at the 2011 FIVB Volleyball Women's Club World Championship.

References

External links

1994 births
Living people
Dominican Republic women's volleyball players
Place of birth missing (living people)
Setters (volleyball)
Middle blockers